Annada Government High School is a government secondary school for boys, in  Brahmanbaria, Bangladesh. The school was named after Raja Roy Bahadur Annada Prashad Roy who was a landlord of Kolkata. The school operates under the Cumilla Education Board.

The school lies in the heart of Brahmanbaria town, the administrative headquarters of the district of the same name. It is the oldest and one of the largest schools in Brahmanbaria District. As of 2006, enrollment was 2,250.

History
The school started out, in 1860, as an aided Anglo-vernacular school. It was upgraded to a high school in 1875 with the help of Annada Choron Roy Bahadur of Cassimbazar and zamindar of Sarail Estate. The founding headmaster was Babu Jogesh Chandra Sarker.

The school was nationalised on 1 May 1968. Babu Binode Bihari was a student of Annada govt high school. He stood first in the matriculation Examination held under the Kolkata University. Later Dr. Wahiduddin Mahmud stood first in the mid-sixties and Md. Jehad Uddin stood first under Cumilla Board in 1991 from this School in the matriculation/SSC examination.

In February 2009, Mrs. Farida Nazmeen joined as a headmaster.

Former Headmasters List

Notable alumni
 Sanaul Huq, a poet and civil servant
 Humayun Kabir, former state minister for health
 Al Mahmud, a notable poet
 Wahiduddin Mahmud, an economist and a past member of the Caretaker government
 Syed Abdul Hadi, award-winning Bangladeshi singer
 Adwaita Mallabarman, author of A River Called Titash, matriculated in 1933
 Abdul Quadir, poet, essayist, and journalist, matriculated in 1923
 M Harunur Rashid, former professor and head of the department of English at Jahangirnagar University
 Atique Islam, current vice chancellor of North South University and professor.

References

Educational institutions established in 1875
High schools in Bangladesh
1875 establishments in India
Schools in Brahmanbaria District
Boys' schools in Bangladesh